Lin-ay sang Negros 2010, the 16th edition of the annual Lin-ay sang Negros pageant was held on March 26, 2010 at the Pana-ad Stadium. She was crowned by 2009 Miss Earth Philippines, Sandra Seifert, and Lin-ay sang Negros 2009 Vickie Marie Rushton

Final Results

References

Beauty pageants in the Philippines
Culture of Negros Occidental
2010 beauty pageants
2010 in the Philippines